The Los Angeles County Bar Association (LACBA) is a voluntary bar association with more than 21,000 members throughout Los Angeles County, California, and the world.  Founded in 1878, LACBA's goal has been to meet the professional needs of lawyers, advance the administration of justice, and serve the public regarding access to justice.

In addition to serving lawyers, LACBA assists those who need legal assistance or who cannot afford it.  In 2010, LACBA’s three projects—Domestic Violence, AIDS Legal Services, and Immigration Legal Assistance—and hundreds of volunteer attorneys helped more than 20,000 people and provided more than $3.6 million of pro bono services. LACBA also provides other services to the general public.

Several of LACBA's past presidents have become notable. Andrew Glassell founded the city of Orange, California, John Dustin Bicknell founded the California cities of Monrovia and Azusa, John D. Works was a U.S. Senator from California, Grant Cooper defended Sirhan Sirhan in his defense trial, and Warren Christopher served under president William Clinton as his Secretary of State. Another past president, Danette Meyers, ran for Los Angeles District Attorney in 2012.

LACBA members have an opportunity to participate in more than 70 practice areas and committees, one of which involves helping those who have served this country.

LACBA Projects
The Domestic Violence Project helps victims of abuse navigate the legal system, prepares temporary restraining order requests, provides preparation for Judicial Hearings and access to pro bono attorneys for Court representation. The Project works with the Los Angeles Superior Court to coordinate help for victims and their families and educates legal and law enforcement professionals about available legal remedies to, and working with, victims of abuse. In 2011, the Domestic Violence Project celebrated its 25th anniversary.

The Immigration Legal Assistance Project provides legal advice for those seeking information on political asylum, green cards, work permits, family petitions, and citizenship. The project operates out of the Federal Building in Los Angeles and is an onsite referral source for immigration officials, and it also trains attorneys in the area of immigration law and procedures. Each year, this project hosts an educational fair in Los Angeles, where free legal advice is offered.

The AIDS Legal Services Project assists clients living with HIV/AIDS on a wide range of human rights and legal issues, helps to stop discrimination, and protects its clients’ rights, benefits, and dignity. The project works with 35 community-based HIV/AIDS organizations in Los Angeles to assist clients in many languages, mostly low-income or poverty clients and people of color.

The Center for Civic Mediation (formerly Dispute Resolution Services or DRS) was established by LACBA as the Neighborhood Justice Center, one of the first three Community Mediation centers in the U.S. The Center for Civic Mediation helps individuals, families, and communities to resolve conflicts through mediation, facilitation, and other problem-solving methods. It provides mediation and conflict resolution training, education, and coaching that prepares people to address disputes in personal, community, and work settings. The Center for Civic Mediation also conducts training as part of its Youth Peer Mediation and Conflict Resolution program. The program aims to prevent violence among youths and impart them with leadership and conflict-resolution skills.

Since 1979, the Los Angeles County Bar Association, through the Attorney-Client Mediation and Arbitration Services Committee (ACMAS), has provided arbitration services pursuant to Business & Professions Code Section 6200 et seq (Business and Professions Code Sections 6200–6206 were enacted for the purpose of providing an alternative forum to the courts in order to resolve disputes between clients and their attorneys over the matter of the amount of fees charged).  Currently, the program is the largest program of this type in the State of California and provides arbitration services to more than 1,000 people on an annual basis.

Lawyer Referral Service
The Los Angeles County Bar Association Lawyer Referral Service, SmartLaw, was established in 1937 and was the first service of its kind in the United States. Members of the public use SmartLaw to find lawyers by phone or online. SmartLaw also provides basic legal information to the public on hundreds of legal issues. In 2019, SmartLaw referred over 16,000 clients. In 2016, the LRS began a “flat fee” program designed to deliver affordable legal services to members of the public. SmartLaw is certified by the State Bar of California to operate in Los Angeles County, Orange County, Riverside County, San Bernardino County, and Ventura County.

LACBA publications
LACBA’s Publications Department publishes Los Angeles Lawyer, a monthly publication featuring the latest in legal news and features, along with a comprehensive list of experts and consultants who can assist lawyers with their cases in the form of experts in certain fields. LACBA also makes the following services and publications available to its members:

 The Daily EBriefs are a free service to all LACBA members. The E-Briefs include summaries of the cases decided in the previous 24 hours by the U.S. Supreme Court, Ninth Circuit Court of Appeals, California Supreme Court, and California Court of Appeal. Each summary includes a link to the full text of the case.
 The Searchable Civil Register  provides attorneys the ability to search all filings in the Los Angeles Court Civil Register using a variety of search criteria, including issues, judges, law firms, and parties involved.
 LACBA supplies members with automated Judicial Council forms from LexisNexis.
 Judge in a Flash (JIF) and Judicial Profiles help attorneys get to know their judges by providing information on the judges' expectations and decision history.
 Elerts supply attorneys with four ways to configure email notifications: by a client's name, case number, new case filing, or by case type.
 Since 1991, LACBA has published the Southern California Directory of Experts & Consultants. This annual directory is a benefit of membership and contains thousands of listings in more than 500 categories of medical, technical, forensic, scientific, and legal experts.

L.A. County Bar Foundation
The Los Angeles County Bar Foundation raises money and distributes it to legal services organizations in Los Angeles County, including LACBA’s three projects: Domestic Violence, AIDS Legal Services, and Immigration Legal Assistance.  
With the help of volunteer lawyers and the financial support of law firms, foundations, corporations, and individual lawyers, the Foundation has contributed more than $8 million to the growth of nonprofit organizations providing legal services to the most needy in the Los Angeles community.

Through its 48 volunteer board members, the Foundation evaluates grant applications and distributes the funds it raises to legal services organizations. $150,000 was allocated to 23 public service legal organizations in fiscal year 2010–2011, and since 1963, the Foundation has allocated $8,004,669.

The Foundation was incorporated in 1967 as a nonprofit public benefit corporation, and it holds several fundraising events per year.

Public Counsel
Founded in 1970, Public Counsel is the public interest law firm of the Los Angeles County and Beverly Hills Bar Associations, among others. Public Counsel is the largest pro bono law office in the U.S. Its principal role is matching volunteer private attorneys with indigent individuals who need legal services. Public Counsel partners with LACBA to achieve the shared goal of maximizing the availability of legal services to the poor in L.A. County.

Affiliated Bar Associations
21 geographic and minority bar associations are affiliated with LACBA by maintaining a level of members in common. Some of the benefits of affiliation to a smaller bar are being connected with LACBA and thus brought to the awareness of its large membership, and having opportunities to participate in the leadership of LACBA through dedicated positions on its Board of Trustees.

History
LACBA has a "Virtual Museum" that chronicles much of its history and significance within Los Angeles' legal community. The museum has a listing of LACBA's past presidents, a biography of Clara Shortridge Foltz, and a chronicle of Los Angeles' legal history amongst other information.

During LACBA's ceremony commemorating its 100th year in 1978, United States president Jimmy Carter gave a speech at a luncheon.

On January 18, 2012, LACBA participated in a rally in downtown Los Angeles to support adequate court funding. Several local and state politicians spoke at the rally, which drew attention to cuts in court funding. One of the rally's featured speakers was former California Governor Gray Davis.

Notable Past Presidents
 Andrew Glassell (1878–1880)
 John D. Bicknell (1890)
 Frank H. Howard (1891)
 Lucien Shaw (1901-1902)
 John D. Works (1903)
 William J. Hunsaker (1904)
 Oscar A. Trippet (1911)
 Henry W. O'Melveny (1919)
 Loyd Wright (1937)
 Walter R. Ely (1962)
 Warren M. Christopher (1974)
 Margaret M. Morrow (1988)
 Laurie D. Zelon (1995)

References

External links
LACBA Home page

American bar associations
1878 establishments in California
Organizations established in 1878
Organizations based in Los Angeles